Andrew Ellis Cook (born 18 October 1990) is an English professional footballer who plays as a forward for League Two club Bradford City. 

He started his professional career with Carlisle United in the Football League in 2009, and found himself on the fringes of the first team but instead he spent numerous loan spells with Workington and Barrow where he featured regularly. He departed Carlisle in 2011 to join Barrow having failed to make an appearance in United's first team and in June 2012 he moved again joining Grimsby Town. After establishing himself as a first team regular at Grimsby he moved back west, for his 4th stint with Barrow. He would find his most prolific goal-scoring form yet in these two seasons, scoring 47 goals in 87 league appearances, which earned him a move to fellow National League side Tranmere Rovers. His time at Tranmere, when he scored 51 goals in 97 appearances, winning him the divisional Golden Boot award, ended in 2018 with a 2–1 victory in the National League play-off final. He left Tranmere at the end of his contract and joined League One club Walsall.

Club career

Carlisle United 
Born in Bishop Auckland, County Durham, Cook started his career with the Carlisle United youth system where he was awarded a scholarship and signed a full-time professional contract, scoring 22 goals in his first season at Brunton Park, and 37 goals in his second season for the club's youth and second-string during the 2008–09 season.

Having signed pro terms Cook was loaned out to Conference North side Workington on an initial one-month loan, but remained there for the rest of the campaign. Cook also rejoined Workington the following season on a one-month loan.

Barrow

2009–10 
In October 2009 Cook joined Conference National side Barrow on an initial one-month loan. He made a scoring debut for the Bluebirds when he netted in the 2–0 win over Ebbsfleet United on 17 October 2009, he scored another goal on 7 November 2009 in the 2–1 first-round FA Cup victory over Eastleigh. He made 3 appearances during his initial loan spell, scoring twice, Cook returned for a second spell almost immediately but broke his foot against AFC Wimbledon, resulting in him taking no more part in the season, he headed back to Carlisle United to recover.

2010–11 
Cook returned to Barrow at the start of the 2010–11 season on a one-month loan before making a permanent move in January 2010 signing a two-and-a-half-year deal on a free transfer. Cook was used mainly as a substitute for the majority of the season. Cook scored just one goal all season, an equaliser from just outside the box in the 3–2 defeat against Crawley Town.

2011–12 
Cook scored his first three goals and also his first hat-trick in a 4–0 win against the previously unbeaten Fleetwood Town. After receiving a red card in a 1–0 win against Lincoln, Cook returned for the bluebirds after serving a three match suspension and scored his second hat-trick in the 3–1 home win against Hayes & Yeading United on 15 October 2011.

On 7 January Cook scored a brace in the 3–0 home thrashing of Darlington. Two more goals were to follow on 21 January 2012 in the 2–3 win at Tamworth. On 18 February 2012, Cook scored another 2 goals in the 3–0 victory against Kettering.

On 28 April 2012, Cook scored his final goal for Barrow in the 3–1 victory against Newport finishing the 2011–12 season with 17 goals in 39 appearances making him the club's top scorer.

Grimsby Town 
Cook signed a two-year contract with the option of a further year with Conference National side Grimsby Town on 6 June 2012, having agreed a compensation deal with Barrow for an undisclosed fee. Cook played 120 minutes at Wembley in the FA Trophy final against Wrexham; he scored to put The Mariners ahead before eventually falling short in a penalty shootout. Cook finished the season with 16 goals in all competitions.

On 9 May 2014, Cook was released by The Mariners, both his seasons with the club ended in Play-off semi-final defeats.

Return to Barrow 
On 30 June 2014, Cook returned to former club Barrow, penning a two-year deal.

Tranmere Rovers 
On 1 July 2016, Cook signed for Tranmere on a two-year deal. Cook was Tranmere's top scorer in both his seasons at Prenton Park, helping Tranmere to a record points total of 95 in 2016-17 and then promotion into the Football League in 2017–18. Cook won the National League Golden Boot as the top scorer in the league for 2017–18. His final goal in a Tranmere shirt was the first goal in Tranmere's 2–1 victory over Boreham Wood in the 2018 National League play-off final.

Walsall 
On 22 May 2018, it was announced that Cook would be signing for Walsall on a two-year contract, linking up with former Wrexham manager, Dean Keates. Cook scored on his EFL debut, a rebound from a penalty in a 2–1 home victory against Plymouth Argyle.

Mansfield Town 
Cook joined Mansfield Town on 21 June 2019 for an undisclosed fee on a two-year contract.

Despite scoring 7 goals in his first 10 games for Mansfield, he was loaned out to former club Tranmere Rovers on 31 January 2020.

At the end of the 2020–21 season, Cook was released by Mansfield.

Bradford City
On 27 January 2021, Cook signed for Bradford City on loan until the end of the 2020–21 season.

After an impressive loan spell that saw him score 8 goals in 16 starts, Cook joined Bradford on a permanent basis on 12 June 2021, signing a two-year deal.

Five goals in four matches in September 2022, taking his account for the season up to 11 in all competitions, saw Cook win the EFL League Two Player of the Month Award.

International career 
On 4 June 2013, Cook made his debut for the England C team in a 6–1 win away at Bermuda.

Career statistics

Honours 
Grimsby Town
Lincolnshire Senior Cup: 2012–13
FA Trophy runners-up: 2012–13

Barrow
National League North: 2014–15

Tranmere Rovers
National League play-offs: 2017–18

Individual
Tranmere Rovers Player of the Year: 2016–17, 2017–18
National League Player of the Month: April 2018
Tranmere Rovers Players' Player of the Year: 2017–18
National League Golden Boot: 2017–18
National League Team of the Year: 2017–18
Walsall Player of the Season: 2018–19
EFL League Two Player of the Month: September 2022

References 

1990 births
Living people
Sportspeople from Bishop Auckland
Footballers from County Durham
English footballers
Association football forwards
Carlisle United F.C. players
Workington A.F.C. players
Barrow A.F.C. players
Grimsby Town F.C. players
Tranmere Rovers F.C. players
Walsall F.C. players
Mansfield Town F.C. players
Bradford City A.F.C. players
National League (English football) players
English Football League players
England semi-pro international footballers